Rabbit's Feat is an animated 1960 Warner Bros. Looney Tunes  cartoon, directed by Chuck Jones and written by Michael Maltese. The short was released on June 4, 1960, and stars Bugs Bunny and Wile E. Coyote. As Maltese had left for Hanna-Barbera, his name was removed from the credits (although his name remained on the credits for The Mouse on 57th Street a year later).

Plot
The scene opens with Wile E Coyote saying, "How do you do? Oh. Allow me to introduce myself. My name is Wile E. Coyote. Uh, I am a genius by trade." Wile E. then explains that he is hunting for the common western rabbit.  Right next to Bugs Bunny's rabbit hole, Wile E. sets out a picnic blanket with cutlery and dishes, in an attempt to lure Bugs. Bugs does come out, sits across from Wile E. and, from the thermos the coyote has brought, pours some coffee into a cup, dips a carrot into it and proceeds to eat. When Bugs asks Wile E., "What's cookin'?", Wile E. responds, "Why, you are!" and succeeds in capturing Bugs by wrapping him up in the picnic blanket.

Next, Wile E. prepares to dip the sack (presumably with Bugs inside) into a cauldron.  However, Bugs is hiding behind a rock and pretends to cry out in agony.  Wile E. shortly realizes he's been tricked and goes to the rock to confront Bugs.  Bugs kisses him and says, "Daddy! You're back from Peru! Oh Papa, we thought you'd been run over by an elevator!" Wile E. spits away the kisses and while sad violin music is playing, Bugs laments, "Boo-hoo! Oh boo-the-hoo! I've been rejected by my onliest father!" Wile E. tries to grab Bugs, but only succeeds in flying headfirst into the cauldron, causing Bugs to remark, "Oh, Father! You're stewed again!"

The next scene shows Wile E. reclining against a rock, talking to himself about how he's going to kill Bugs. Bugs sneaks over, reclines on the opposite side of the rock and joins in the conversation, rejecting the first two ideas (which involve either a rock-crusher or a Burmese tiger trap). Soon, Wile E. is actually discussing his plans with Bugs (not realizing it is him). When he mentions putting dynamite into a carrot, Bugs lets out a huge yell and Wile E. sails into the sky, landing on his head when he comes back down. "That'd hurt", Bugs tells him.

An attempt to shoot Bugs with a rifle fails as Bugs keeps turning the barrel in different directions and then replaces the end-sight so that Wile E. ends up (repeatedly) shooting himself. Wile E's final effort (involving a hand grenade being thrown down Bugs' hole) likewise ends up with him getting the worst of it, so that he finally says to Bugs, "How do you do? I am a vegetarian; my name is Mud," and then asks the audience, "Is there a doctor in the house?", before falling back down.

Bugs ends the cartoon declaring, "Well, like the man says: 'Don't take life too seriously- you'll never get out of it alive '!"

References

External links
 
 

American short films
1960 animated films
1960 short films
1960s American animated films
1960s Warner Bros. animated short films
Short films directed by Chuck Jones
Looney Tunes shorts
Wile E. Coyote and the Road Runner films
Films scored by Milt Franklyn
Bugs Bunny films
Films with screenplays by Michael Maltese
1960s English-language films
American animated short films
Animated films about rabbits and hares
Films about Canis
American comedy short films